1176 Lucidor, provisional designation , is a carbonaceous background asteroid from the central region of the asteroid belt, approximately 30 kilometers in diameter. It was discovered by Eugène Delporte in 1930, who named it after a friend.

Discovery 

Lucidor was discovered on 15 November 1930, by Belgian astronomer Eugène Delporte at the Royal Observatory of Belgium in Uccle. On the same day, it was independently discovered by Max Wolf at the Heidelberg Observatory in Germany, and 15 days later by Grigory Neujmin at Simeiz Observatory in Crimea.

Orbit and classification 

Lucidor has not been grouped to any known asteroid family. It orbits the Sun in the central main belt at a distance of 2.3–3.1 AU once every 4 years and 5 months (1,613 days). Its orbit has an eccentricity of 0.14 and an inclination of 7° with respect to the ecliptic.

Physical characteristics 

In the SMASS classification, Lucidor is a carbonaceous C-type asteroid.

Rotation period 

In November 2005, two rotational lightcurves of Lucidor were independently obtained from photometric observations by Brian Warner at his Palmer Divide Observatory in Colorado as well as by   René Roy at Blauvac, France, and Federico Manzini and Roberto Crippa at Sozzago in Italy. Lightcurve analysis gave a well-defined rotation period of 4.075 and 4.0791 hours with a low brightness amplitude of 0.05 and 0.06 magnitude, respectively. A low brightness variation typically indicates that the body has a spheroidal rather than an irregular shape.

Diameter and albedo 

According to the surveys carried out by the Infrared Astronomical Satellite IRAS, the Japanese Akari satellite and the NEOWISE mission of NASA's Wide-field Infrared Survey Explorer, Lucidor measures between 17.489 and 31.48 kilometers in diameter  and its surface has an albedo between 0.04 and 0.159.

The Collaborative Asteroid Lightcurve Link derives an albedo of 0.0544 and  a diameter of 30.59 kilometers based on an absolute magnitude of 11.35.

Naming 

This minor planet was named after an amateur astronomer and friend of the discoverer. "Lucidor" is a female name. Her full name has not been published. The official naming citation was mentioned in The Names of the Minor Planets by Paul Herget in 1955.

Notes

References

External links 
 Asteroid Lightcurve Database (LCDB), query form (info )
 Dictionary of Minor Planet Names, Google books
 Asteroids and comets rotation curves, CdR – Observatoire de Genève, Raoul Behrend
 Discovery Circumstances: Numbered Minor Planets (1)-(5000) – Minor Planet Center
 
 

001176
Discoveries by Eugène Joseph Delporte
Named minor planets
001176
19301115